Hong Joon-pyo (born 20 November 1953), also spelled as Hong Jun-pyo, is a South Korean politician and former prosecutor who is the current Mayor of Daegu. He previous served as the governor of South Gyeongsang Province, a member of the National Assembly for five terms, and the party leader of the conservative Grand National Party in 2011 and its successor incarnation the Liberty Korea Party from 2017 to 2018.

He was the presidential nominee of the Liberty Korea Party in the 2017 South Korean presidential election and came in second place during the general election, losing to Moon Jae-in. Hong ran as a candidate in the 2022 South Korean presidential election for the nomination of the conservative People Power Party and came in second place during the primaries, narrowly losing to Yoon Suk-yeol.

Early life and career 
He was born in Changnyeong, South Gyeongsang Province. Hong graduated from Yeungnam High School and received his undergraduate degree in Public Administration from Korea University.

Entry into Politics
In January 1996, Hong joined the New Korea Party. He was elected for the Songpa A constituency during the 1996 election and entered the National Assembly for the first time.

First tenure as Party Leader (2011) 
Hong was formerly the chairperson of the Grand National Party(which changed its name to the Saenuri Party in 2012 and again changed its name to the Liberty Korea Party in 2017). He stepped down as the chairperson on 9 December 2011 and was replaced by future President Park Geun-hye.

Comments on Park Won-soon 
On 20 October 2011, Hong criticized Seoul Mayor Park Won-soon's The Beautiful Foundation (아름다운재단) for sending money to left-wing citizen groups. Hong was known to have generated much criticism against Park Won-soon in regards to Park's possible allegation of extorting tax money for his oversea visits.

Comments on former Grand National Party 
He considered to rename the Grand National Party to another name after Park Won-soon won the October 2011 election.

Governor of South Gyeongsang Province (2012–2017) 
Hong was first elected as Governor of South Gyeongsang Province in 2012, and re-elected in 2014.

2017 South Korean presidential election 
Hong secured the nomination of the Liberty Korea Party. His campaign appealed to older, conservative voters with a platform describing Hong as a "strongman." Hong has stated he wanted to be a strong man similar to Park Chung-hee, a former Korean president and dictator who is popular with older conservatives and whose daughter Park Geun-hye was recently impeached amidst allegations of corruption.

Hong finished second among the five major candidates with 24% of the vote behind Moon Jae-in.

Second tenure as party leader (2017–2018) 
Hong was elected as the leader of Liberty Korea Party following his loss in the presidential election. After leading the party to a massive loss in the 2018 local elections on 13 June 2018, Hong resigned as party leader on 14 June 2018.

Independent politician (2020–2021) 
On 17 February 2020, the Liberty Korea Party dissolved and merged with several other parties to become the United Future Party. Hong left the United Future Party in March 2020 after party leaders decided not to give him a candidacy in any of the upcoming 2020 legislative elections. Running as an independent candidate, Hong won the National Assembly election of Suseong B in Daegu on 15 April 2020.

Return to People Power Party, second presidential bid (2021–present)
On 24 June 2021, Hong rejoined the People Power Party (which had formerly been called the United Future Party until 2 September 2020), and signaled a presidential bid in the upcoming 2022 South Korean presidential election.

On 29 June 2021, Hong Joon-pyo officially entered the 2022 presidential election. He placed 2nd in the final round of the primaries behind the winner Yoon Seok-yeol, winning 41.5 percent of the votes. On 26 April 2022, Hong resigned from the National Assembly after he was chosen as the People Power's nominee for the mayor of Daegu. He would go on to win the election for mayor of Daegu and begin his term on 1 July 2022.

Political positions

Corporate corruption 

Hong holds economically conservative views. He supports Korean conglomerates, also known as chaebols and wants to reduce the power of labor unions. When asked how he would respond to growing concerns around corrupt practices amongst chaebols, such as those that brought down former President Park Geun-hye's administration, he stated that he would reduce corruption by putting it through a "washing machine".

National security 
Hong has supported maintaining a vigilant approach to national security, supporting the deployment of the Terminal High Altitude Area Defense (THAAD) from the United States. He supports "armed peace." Hong has stated that he supports the nuclear armament of South Korea.

Anti-LGBT stance 
Hong has publicly indicated that he believes that AIDS and HIV are a result of homosexuality, in order to attract the support of conservative voters. In a televised presidential debate, Hong criticized Moon Jae-in on his stances on homosexuality and remarked gay soldiers were a source of weakness in Korean military.

Death Penalty 
Hong supports the death penalty. He has said he would revive capital punishment if elected.

See also
 2017 South Korean presidential election
 Lee Myung-bak government
 Liberty Korea Party
 Right-wing populism

References

External links
 
 

1954 births
Korea University alumni
Lee Myung-bak Government
Right-wing populism in South Korea
South Korean anti-communists
Living people
Governors of South Gyeongsang Province
Discrimination against LGBT people in South Korea
South Korean Protestants
People from Changnyeong County
Members of the National Assembly (South Korea)
Candidates for President of South Korea
Liberty Korea Party politicians
People Power Party (South Korea) politicians
South Korean prosecutors